The Spillgerte (or Spillgerten) is a mountain of the Bernese Alps, located east of Zweisimmen in the Bernese Oberland. The mountain lies between the valleys of Diemtigen and Simmental, a few kilometres north of the Albristhorn. It is composed of several summits of which the Hinderi Spillgerte (2,476 m) is the highest.

References

External links
 Spillgerte on Hikr

Mountains of the Alps
Mountains of Switzerland
Mountains of the canton of Bern
Two-thousanders of Switzerland